N. K. Jose (born 2 February 1929) from Kerala, India is a Historian and President of the Kerala History Congress known for his studies in Dalit and Christian history. Author of over 140 history and social history books, he was given the title Dalit Bandhu by Dalit organizations in 1990 in recognition of his contributions to Dalit studies and Dalit history.

In 2019, for outstanding contributions in the field of Malayalam literature, he has been awarded Kerala Sahitya Akademi Award for Overall contribution. Presenting the award, the then Chairman of the Kerala Sahitya Akademi, Vaisakhan, said that the contribution of N. K. Jose, a historian who has shed light on the unknown history of Kerala, was unparallel.

Biography
N. K Jose was born on 2 February 1929 in Vechoor, Vaikom, Kottayam district to Kurien and Mariamma. His Schooling was in Cherthala and Changanassery. In his memoirs, Jose writes about the Punnapra-Vayalar uprising that took place when he was a child. He was educated at Thevara Sacred Hearts college and St. Albert's college Ernakulam. He passed his BA degree from Madras University.

During his studies, Jose became interested in communist socialist ideas. His contact with Vaikom Muhammad Basheer had a significant impact on his life. His first short story "Ente Premam" was written while studying in the fourth forum (now ninth class) at the Cherthala Government English School. At the age of 23, he wrote his first book, Muthalalitham Bharathathil (Literally meaning Capitalism in India). After completing his college education, he studied Gandhian thoughts and socialist studies at the Gandhi Ashram in Wardha. Later in his life, Jose strongly criticized Gandhi. Jose's political gurus were socialist leaders like Ram Manohar Lohia, Vinoba Bhave and Jayaprakash Narayan. He switched from the Socialist wing in the Congress party to the Socialist Party of India and later to the Praja Socialist Party (PSP). When he was the state office bearer of the PSP, the party was in the ruling front in Travancore. The police firing in Marthandam led to an all-India split in the PSP and because of this Jose quit active politics.

He held several state level positions in the Kerala Catholic Congress during the 1960s. Then he read Ambedkar's biography, and realized that what he was looking for was Ambedkarism. He left Catholicism in 1983 and became a full-time Dalit history researcher. Jose's works were a breakdown of traditional history and perceptions that have been held for generations. His main books are classifeied into two series - Nasrani Series (books in Christian history) and Dalit Series (books in Dalit history).

On September 24, 1990, at a conference of dalit organizations in Kottayam, Jose was honored with the title of 'Dalit Bandhu' in honor of his dalit studies. Since then he has adopted it as his pen name.

Jose resides at his house Namasivayam in Ambika market, Vaikom.

Contributions 
Jose has made many discoveries in the history of Kerala that refute the misconceptions that existed till then. He published books on facts about the Buddhist history of Kerala which was covered by the dominant Hindu consensus in Kerala. In the Padmanabhaswami temple property controversy, arguments on the Buddhist history of Kerala were put forward in a book written by him. He done the first major comprehensive study of the life history of Arattupuzha Velayudha Panicker. 

Jose had openly said that the belief that Kerala Christians were converts from Brahmins was a figment of the imagination of church leaders. It was found that Brahmanism has only half the age of Christianity in Kerala. He also refuted the new idea, that the origin of Christians was not from the Bahamins but from the Jews of ancient Kerala. Jose argues that the early Christians in Kerala were the adivasis of the country and that the transformation took place at a time when the caste system did not exist. Jose says that in recent times, dalits and other vulnerable groups have converted to Christianity to get rid of the caste system. Jose repeatedly points out that the Buddhist / Jain / Dalit traditions, culture and history of the area were systematically ignored.

Works

Some books in the dalit series 
Channar lahala (book on Channar revolt)
Pulaya lahala (book on Pulaya revolt)
Kshetrapraveshana vilambaram (book on Temple Entry Proclamation)
Vaikom Satyagraha oru prahelika (literally meaning Vaikom Satyagraha is an enigma)
Shipayi lahala oru dalit munnettam (literally meaning sipoy revolts are a dalit movement)
Veluthampi Dalava (book on life of Velu Thampi Dalawa)
Diwan Monroe (book on life of Diwan Monroe)
Ambedkar (book on life of B. R. Ambedkar)
Mahanaya Ayyankali (book on life of Ayyankali)
Vaikuntha Swamikal (book on life of Ayya Vaikundar)
Jyotirao Phule (book on life of Jyotirao Phule)
Kerala Parashurama Pulaya shathru (literally meaning Kerala Parashurama is the enemy of Pulaya)
Kraisthava dalithar (book on Christian dalits)
Ambedkarum Manusmritiyum (literally meaning Ambedkar and Manusmriti)
Gandhi Gandhism Dalitar (book on Gandhi Gandhism and Dalits)
Gandhi vadham oru punarvayana (A re-reading of the Assassination of Mahatma Gandhi)
Valmiki oru baudhano (literally meaning Is Valmiki a Buddhist?)
Karutha America (literally meaning Black America)
Karutha Keralam (literally meaning Black Kerala)

Some books in Nasrani Series
Adima Kerala kraisthavarute aradhana bhasha (book on Worship language of early Kerala Christians)
Arnos pathiri (bookon life of Priest Arnos)
Knayithomman oru sathyamo?
Keralathile katholica armayar (book on Catholic laity in Kerala)
Bharathathile kristhumatham (book on Christianity in India)
Keralathile suriyani sabhayute uthbhavam (book on origin of the Syrian Church in Kerala)
Mar Thoma Roccas (book on life of Mar Thoma Roccas)
Jathikku karthavyan Geevarghese
History of Syro Malabar Qurbana
Siro malabar kurbanayute charithram (book on origin of the Syrian Church in Kerala)
Kaldaya paithrukam (book on East Syriac Rite)
Kudavachoor palli (book on history of Kudavachoor Church)
Knanaya (book on history of Knanaya)
Nasrani (literalally meaning Christian)
Adima kerala sabha (literally meaning Primitive Kerala Church)
Nilaykkal

Others 
Sree Padmanabhaswami Kshetranidhi Arudeth? (Meaning: Whose is the treasure of Sri Padmanabhaswamy Temple?)

Awards and honours
Kerala Sahitya Akademi Award for Overall Contributions 2019

Family
In 1955 he married Thankamma. The couple has no children.

References

Historians of India
Recipients of the Kerala Sahitya Akademi Award
People from Vaikom